The Allen Formation is a geological formation in Argentina whose strata date back to the Late Cretaceous (middle Campanian to early Maastrichtian. Dinosaur remains are among the fossils that have been recovered from the formation.

Description 

The stratotype of the formation was defined by Uliana and Dellapé in 1981 in the eastern area of the Bajo de Añelo, where the relation between base and top is clearly exposed. The deposits are mostly clastic, interbedded with banks of limestone and layers of anhydrite, which were defined continental and shallow marine facies associated with semiarid conditions.

The interpreted sedimentary paleoenvironments range from purely continental such as ephemeral lacustrine, aeolian and fluvial systems to coastal marine paleoenvironments with development of estuaries and tidal flats, followed by a lagoon sedimentary stage from marsh to sea with carbonate precipitation in an area protected from waves, ending with a retraction leading to the accumulation of evaporites.

A detailed facies analysis of the formation was performed by Armas and Sánchez in 2015, where the authors concluded the formation represents a hybrid coastal system
of tidal flats, dominated by Atlantic ingressions, with a large storm influence in some areas linked to aeolian systems.

Fossil content

Dinosaurs 
Dinosaur eggs are known from the formation.

Pterosaurs 
Fragmentary fossils are known from the formation.

Rhynchocephalia

Plesiosauria

Frogs
Unnamed frog belonging to family Calyptocephalellidae also exists.

Mammals 
The mammal fauna of the Allen Formation is known from seven teeth, which document the presence of several species.

Plants

See also 
 List of dinosaur-bearing rock formations
 Adamantina Formation
 La Colonia Formation
 Lecho Formation
 Los Alamitos Formation
 Los Llanos Formation
 Marília Formation

References

Bibliography

Further reading 

 O'Gorman, J. P., Salgado, L., y Gasparini, Z., 2011. Plesiosaurios de la Formación Allen (Campaniano-Maastrichtiano) en el área del Salitral de Santa Rosa (Provincia de Río Negro, Argentina). Ameghiniana 48 (1): 129-135

 
Geologic formations of Argentina
Cretaceous Argentina
Sandstone formations
Limestone formations
Mudstone formations
Aeolian deposits
Evaporite deposits
Fluvial deposits
Lacustrine deposits
Cretaceous paleontological sites of South America
Paleontology in Argentina
Malargüe Group